Hermes Gamonal (born 31 May 1977) is a former professional tennis player from Chile.

Career
Gamonal first played Davis Cup tennis for Chile in 1998 and by the time he retired had taken part in nine ties. He won three of his eight singles rubbers and four of his five doubles matches.

The Chilean appeared in one Grand Slam event during his career, the 2003 French Open. He lost in straight sets to Christophe Rochus in the first round.

By late 2006, Gamonal decided to retire from professional tennis, claiming that multiple injuries interrupted his career.

Challenger titles

Singles: (1)

Doubles: (1)

References

1977 births
Living people
Chilean male tennis players
Tennis players at the 1999 Pan American Games
Pan American Games competitors for Chile
21st-century Chilean people
20th-century Chilean people